Rustam Ruslanovich Sosranov (born 23 July 1994) is a Russian football player. He plays for SKA-Khabarovsk-2.

Club career
He made his debut in the Russian Second Division for FC Gubkin on 29 April 2012 in a game against FC Podolye Podolsky district.

He made his Russian Football National League debut for FC Baltika Kaliningrad on 12 March 2016 in a game against PFC Sokol Saratov.

References

External links
 
 
 

1994 births
Sportspeople from Vladikavkaz
Living people
Russian footballers
Association football midfielders
FC Minsk players
FK Jelgava players
FC Baltika Kaliningrad players
FC Spartak Vladikavkaz players
FC SKA Rostov-on-Don players
FC Mashuk-KMV Pyatigorsk players
FC Olimp-Dolgoprudny players
FC SKA-Khabarovsk players
Russian First League players
Russian Second League players
Latvian Higher League players
Russian expatriate footballers
Expatriate footballers in Belarus
Russian expatriate sportspeople in Belarus
Expatriate footballers in Latvia
Russian expatriate sportspeople in Latvia